Scotia Naval Supply Depot was a United States Navy supply depot located in Scotia, New York from 1942 to 1971.

Contaminantion
In 2010 the federal government acknowledged the lingering soil contamination, and is taking responsibility for cleaning up the pollution.

Location
This is a 310-acre site near Thruway Exit 26.

Businesspark
The area was renamed after the Glenville Business and Technology Park.  There are 20+ owners of parcels within the park.  The largest landowner is the Schenectady County Industrial Development Agency with those properties operated by the Galesi Group.

References

Closed installations of the United States Navy
Military facilities in New York (state)
Buildings and structures in Schenectady County, New York